Dolmar-Salzbrücke is a Verwaltungsgemeinschaft ("collective municipality") in the district Schmalkalden-Meiningen, in Thuringia, Germany. The seat of the Verwaltungsgemeinschaft is in Schwarza. It was formed on 1 January 2012 from the former Verwaltungsgemeinschaften Dolmar and Salzbrücke.

The Verwaltungsgemeinschaft Dolmar-Salzbrücke consists of the following municipalities:
Belrieth
Christes 
Dillstädt 
Einhausen 
Ellingshausen
Kühndorf 
Leutersdorf 
Neubrunn
Obermaßfeld-Grimmenthal
Ritschenhausen 
Rohr 
Schwarza
Utendorf
Vachdorf

References

Verwaltungsgemeinschaften in Thuringia